Tegula excavata, common name the green-based tegula, is a species of sea snail, a marine gastropod mollusk in the family Tegulidae.

Description
The height of the shell varies between 12 mm and 18 mm. The umbilicate shell has a conical shape. It is dull grayish, olivaceous or pinkish, longitudinally lineolate with a darker shade, frequently appearing unicolored. The  spire is conic. The apex is eroded or acute. The 6 to 7 whorls are flattened, scarcely convex, very obsoletely spirally grooved. The body whorl is acutely carinated at the periphery, flat or plano-concave beneath, concentrically lirate. The large aperture is subhorizontal, iridescent within. The columella is sinuous, unidentate in the middle, green, half surrounding the umbilicus with a sickle-shaped callus. The umbilicus is funnel-shaped, green or white within, broadly expanding at its opening.

Distribution
This species occurs in the Gulf of Mexico, the Caribbean Sea and the Lesser Antilles.

References

External links
 Gastropods.com: Tegula|excavata

excavata
Gastropods described in 1822